Leona Radnor was an American stage actress, screenwriter, and author active in the early 1900s.

On Broadway, Radnor performed in The Marriage of William Ashe (1905).

Radnor published one of the earliest manuals on screenwriting, and contributed to a publication called Motion Picture Story Magazine. She also wrote scenarios for directors like Henry MacRae and Dell Henderson. She wrote other screenplays she did not receive credit for. Little is known about her life.

Selected works 
Screenplays:

 The Conspiracy (1916)
 An Up-to-Date Lochinvar (1913)
 The Birth of the Lotus Blossom (1912) (uncredited)
 The Making of a Man (1911) (uncredited)

Publications:

 The Photoplay Writer (1912)

References 

Women film pioneers
American women screenwriters
American screenwriters
American stage actresses
Year of birth missing
Year of death missing
20th-century American actresses